Jesse Dashiell Price (August 15, 1863 – May 14, 1939) was a Congressman for the 1st congressional district of Maryland who served two full terms and one partial term from 1914 to 1919.

Price was born in Whitehaven, Maryland, and engaged in mercantile and manufacturing enterprises and in banking.  He served as a member of the city council of Salisbury, Maryland, in 1903, and as treasurer of Wicomico County, Maryland, from 1903 to 1907.  He served in the Maryland State Senate from 1908 to 1916 and served as president of the senate and ex officio Lieutenant Governor from 1912 to 1916, when he resigned to enter Congress.

Price was elected as a Democrat to Congress to fill the vacancy caused by the resignation of J. Harry Covington, serving the 1st Congressional district of Maryland from November 3, 1914, to March 3, 1919, but was an unsuccessful candidate for reelection in 1918.  He resumed his former business pursuits, and later served as a member of the Maryland State tax commission from 1923 to 1935.  He died at Ocean City, Maryland, and is interred in Parsons Cemetery of Salisbury.

References

1863 births
1939 deaths
Democratic Party Maryland state senators
Presidents of the Maryland State Senate
People from Wicomico County, Maryland
Democratic Party members of the United States House of Representatives from Maryland
People from Salisbury, Maryland